The 2020 Tacoma Defiance season is the club's sixth year of existence, formerly as Seattle Sounders FC 2, and their sixth season in the USL Championship, the second tier of the United States Soccer Pyramid. This is the 3rd season of the soccer team playing in Tacoma, Washington. Defiance is majority owned by Seattle Sounders FC.

Current roster

Competitions

Preseason

Friendlies

USL regular season

Standings — Group A

Results summary

Results by matchday

Matches

U.S. Open Cup 

Due to their ownership by a higher division professional club (Seattle Sounders FC), Tacoma is one of 15 teams expressly forbidden from entering the Cup competition.

Statistics

Appearances and goals

Numbers after plus-sign(+) denote appearances as a substitute.

Top scorers
{| class="wikitable" style="font-size: 95%; text-align: center;"
|-
!width=30|Rank
!width=30|Position
!width=30|Number
!width=180|Name
!width=75|
!width=75|
!width=75|Total
|-
|rowspan="1"|1
|FW
|32
|align="left"| Alec Díaz
|5
|0
|5
|-
|rowspan="3"|4
|FW
|34
|align="left"| Danny Robles
|3
|0
|3
|-
|MF
|80
|align="left"| Ray Serrano
|3
|0
|3
|-
|MF
|90
|align="left"| Chino Pérez
|3
|0
|3
|-
|rowspan="1"|5
|MF
|38
|align="left"| Azriel Gonzalez
|2
|0
|2
|-
|rowspan="8"|6
|DF
|33
|align="left"| Sam Rogers
|1
|0
|1
|-
|MF
|40
|align="left"| Chris Hegardt
|1
|0
|1
|-
|MF
|45
|align="left"| Ethan Dobbelaere
|1
|0
|1
|-
|MF
|74
|align="left"| Taylor Mueller
|1
|0
|1
|-
|MF
|87
|align="left"| Alfonso Ocampo-Chavez
|1
|0
|1
|-
|MF
|89
|align="left"| Jesse Daley
|1
|0
|1
|-
|DF
|92
|align="left"| Abdoulaye Cissoko
|1
|0
|1
|-
|FW
|99
|align="left"| Justin Dhillon
|1
|0
|1
|-

Top assists
{| class="wikitable" style="font-size: 95%; text-align: center;"
|-
!width=30|Rank
!width=30|Position
!width=30|Number
!width=180|Name
!width=75|
!width=75|
!width=75|Total
|-
|rowspan="2"|1
|FW
|34
|align="left"| Danny Robles
|3
|0
|3
|-
|DF
|81
|align="left"| Danny Reynolds
|3
|0
|3
|-
|rowspan="4"|3
|FW
|32
|align="left"| Alec Díaz
|2
|0
|2
|-
|MF
|39
|align="left"| Marlon Vargas
|2
|0
|2
|-
|FW
|87
|align="left"| Alfonso Ocampo-Chavez
|2
|0
|2
|-
|MF
|98
|align="left"| Antonee Burke-Gilroy
|2
|0
|2
|-
|rowspan="4|7
|FW
|37
|align="left"| Shandon Hopeau
|1
|0
|1
|-
|MF
|40
|align="left"| Chris Hegardt
|1
|0
|1
|-
|MF
|90
|align="left"| Chino Pérez
|1
|0
|1
|-
|MF
|98
|align="left"| Azriel Gonzalez
|1
|0
|1
|-

Disciplinary record
{| class="wikitable" style="text-align:center;"
|-
| rowspan="2" !width=15|
| rowspan="2" !width=15|
| rowspan="2" !width=120|Player
| colspan="3"|Regular Season
| colspan="3"|Playoffs
| colspan="3"|Total
|-
!width=34; background:#fe9;"|
!width=34; background:#fe9;"|
!width=34; background:#ff8888;"|
!width=34; background:#fe9;"|
!width=34; background:#fe9;"|
!width=34; background:#ff8888;"|
!width=34; background:#fe9;"|
!width=34; background:#fe9;"|
!width=34; background:#ff8888;"|
|-
|-
|| 31 || |DF ||align=left| Nick Hinds || |1|| |0|| |0|| |0|||0|| |0|| |1|| |0|| |0
|-
|-
|| 32 || |FW ||align=left| Alec Díaz || |1|| |0|| |0|| |0|||0|| |0|| |1|| |0|| |0
|-
|-
|| 32 || |FW ||align=left| Danny Robles || |1|| |0|| |0|| |0|||0|| |0|| |1|| |0|| |0
|-
|-
|| 38 || |MF ||align=left| Azriel Gonzalez || |1|| |0|| |0|| |0|||0|| |0|| |1|| |0|| |0
|-
|-
|| 40 || |MF ||align=left| Chris Hegardt || |2|| |0|| |0|| |0|||0|| |0|| |2|| |0|| |0
|-
|-
|| 43 || |MF ||align=left| Sota Kitahara || |3|| |0|| |0|| |0|||0|| |0|| |3|| |0|| |0
|-
|-
|| 49 || |MF ||align=left| Reed Baker-Whiting || |1|| |0|| |0|| |0|||0|| |0|| |1|| |0|| |0
|-
|-
|| 52 || |DF ||align=left| Eric Kinzner || |1|| |0|| |0|| |0|||0|| |0|| |1|| |0|| |0
|-
|-
|| 64 || |GK ||align=left| Christian Herrera || |1|| |0|| |0|| |0|||0|| |0|| |1|| |0|| |0
|-
|-
|| 74 || |DF ||align=left| Taylor Mueller || |2|| |0|| |0|| |0|||0|| |0|| |2|| |0|| |0
|-
|-
|| 80 || |MF ||align=left| Ray Serrano || |1|| |0|| |0|| |0|||0|| |0|| |1|| |0|| |0
|-
|-
|| 81 || |DF ||align=left| Danny Reynolds || |1|| |0|| |0|| |0|||0|| |0|| |1|| |0|| |0
|-
|-
|| 84 || |MF ||align=left| Josh Atencio || |1|| |0|| |0|| |0|||0|| |0|| |1|| |0|| |0
|-
|-
|| 87 || |FW ||align=left| Alfonso Ocampo-Chavez || |1|| |0|| |0|| |0|||0|| |0|| |1|| |0|| |0
|-
|-
|| 89 || |DF ||align=left| Jesse Daley || |2|| |0|| |0|| |0|||0|| |0|| |2|| |0|| |0
|-
|-
|| 92 || |DF ||align=left| Abdoulaye Cissoko || |2|| |0|| |0|| |0|||0|| |0|| |2|| |0|| |0
|-
|-
|| 97 || |MF ||align=left| Collin Fernandez || |1|| |0|| |0|| |0|||0|| |0|| |1|| |0|| |0
|-
|-
|| 98 || |MF ||align=left| Antonee Burke-Gilroy || |1|| |0|| |0|| |0|||0|| |0|| |1|| |0|| |0
|-
!colspan=3|Total !!24!!0!!0!!0!!0!!0!!24!!0!!0

Honors and awards

Team of the Week

Transfers 

For transfers in, dates listed are when Tacoma Defiance officially signed the players to the roster. Transactions where only the rights to the players are acquired are not listed. For transfers out, dates listed are when Defiance officially removed the players from its roster, not when they signed with another club. If a player later signed with another club, his new club will be noted, but the date listed here remains the one when he was officially removed from Tacoma Defiance roster.

In

Out

References 

Tacoma
Tacoma
Tacoma Defiance
Tacoma Defiance seasons